Brian Woods may refer to:

 Brian Woods (filmmaker) (born 1963), British documentary filmmaker
 Brian Woods (darts player) (born 1966), English darts player

See also 
 Brian Wood (disambiguation)